Erika Michaelanne Costell (born November 12, 1992) is an American Internet personality.  Costell’s career began when she became associated with Team 10, an influencer marketing management agency. After dating YouTuber Jake Paul and featuring in his videos, Costell started her own YouTube channel, which increased her popularity.

Early life and education 
Costell was born in Toledo, Ohio, but she was raised in Bedford Township, Monroe County, Michigan, growing up with 12 siblings. At the age of 16, she began modeling while attending high school at Bedford High School in Michigan. She was previously represented by Wilhelmina International and the DAN Talent Group. After completing high school in 2011, she attended Middle Tennessee State University. She majored in business administration and left the university before her final semester in order to pursue modeling in Los Angeles.

Career 
 
In 2015, Costell became the first employee of Jake Paul's Team 10 on the business side as his assistant and later went on to be the COO Chief Operations Officer. In 2017, she began a YouTube channel where she regularly posts vlogs, reaction videos and music videos.  Following her 2018 breakup with Paul, she left Team 10 to pursue her own independent career, and signed with The Orchard for music.

In 2017, her single "Jerika" with Paul was featured on the Billboard Hot 100 and the Canadian Hot 100.

In 2020, Costell started a record label named BIA Entertainment, which she describes as "a music label by women, for women."

Discography

Extended plays 
 Don't Worry (2019)

Singles

As lead artist

Awards and nominations

See also

 List of YouTubers

References

External links 

1992 births
Living people
American child models
American YouTubers
Female models from Michigan
Middle Tennessee State University alumni
People from Calhoun County, Michigan
Singers from Michigan
Women video bloggers
American women bloggers
American bloggers
Fashion YouTubers
People from Toledo, Ohio